Nothin' but Good is the second album by American country music singer Dawn Sears. It was released in 1994 via Decca Records.

Critical reception
Giving it 3 out of 5 stars, Jim Ridley of New Country magazine thought that the album's production was "straight down the middle of a pop-country road" and "still fails to register Sears' own personality strongly", but thought that her performances on "Runaway Train", "Uh Oh", and "Planet of Love" were solid. He added that she "sings most movingly" on "Little Orphan Annie", a song written in tribute to her parents.

Track listing

Personnel
Compiled from liner notes.

Musicians
Mike Brignardello — bass guitar
Mark Casstevens — acoustic guitar
Stuart Duncan — fiddle
Pat Flynn — acoustic guitar
Paul Franklin — steel guitar
Rob Hajacos — fiddle
Owen Hale — drums
John Hughey — steel guitar
B. James Lowry — acoustic guitar
Nashville String Machine — strings
Steve Nathan — keyboards
Russ Pahl — steel guitar
Brent Rowan — electric guitar, gut string guitar
Dawn Sears — lead vocals
Kenny Sears — fiddle
Biff Watson — acoustic guitar
Willie Weeks — bass guitar

Backing vocalists
Dana McVicker — on "Nothin' but Good"
Vince Gill — on "If I Didn't Have You in My World"
Jana King
Mary Ann Kennedy and Pam Rose — on "Runaway Train"
Patty Loveless — on "Close Up the Honky Tonks"
Jonell Mosser — on "If I Didn't Have You in My World"
Dawn Sears
Lisa Silver
Cindy Richardson-Walker
Bergen White
Jeff White

Technical
Robert Charles — engineering, overdubs
Carl Gorodetzky — concert master
Mark Hagen — engineering
Warren Peterson — recording, overdubs
Lynn Peterzell — mixing
Denny Purcell — mastering
 Bergen White — string arrangements, conductor
Mark Wright — production

References

1994 albums
Dawn Sears albums
Albums produced by Mark Wright (record producer)
Decca Records albums